Hazel Katherine Stiebeling (1896–1989) was an American nutritionist who pioneered the development of USDA programs for nutrition including USDA daily dietary allowances of vitamins and minerals.

Early life
Stiebeling was born in Haskins, Ohio in 1896, on a farm, where her interest in food and nutrition is thought to have developed. In high school she studied domestic science.

Education
After high school, Stiebeling enrolled in a two year program in domestic science at Skidmore College. She is said to have discovered Dr. Henry Sherman's book, "The Chemistry of Food and Nutrition," in the college's library and to have been inspired by it.

After graduating from Skidmore, Stiebeling was employed for three years as a schoolteacher and then she entered the Columbia University Teachers' College where she was an assistant in Foods and Nutrition under Professor Mary Swartz Rose. She graduated with a BS in 1919, and then completed an MA in nutrition in 1924.

Stiebeling became a research fellow under Dr. Henry Sherman at the Graduate School of Columbia University after receiving her MA. Her research was in the basal metabolism of women, the influence of vitamin D on calcium deposition in bone, the nutritional value of protein in human subjects, and others projects. She was awarded a PhD in chemistry in 1928. Her thesis was on a method for studying the content of vitamins A and D in tissues.

In 1930, after graduation from the PhD program, she was hired as Head of the new Section on Food Economics at the USDA Bureau of Home Economics. There, she conducted an extensive investigation of the nutritional value of US diets that has continued until the present day (2005).

Notable scientific contributions
Hazel Stiebeling developed a USDA publication on diet planning in 1933 that is the first known publication to include the term "dietary allowances". It was the first quantitative national dietary standard for the minerals calcium, phosphorus, iron, and vitamins A and C. The values were based on her research in the Sherman laboratory.

In 1939 Stiebeling worked with Esther Phipard to include USDA dietary allowances for thiamine and riboflavin. Their proposal for recognizing some variance between individuals in a population also stimulated an "allowance of a margin of 50% above the average minimum for normal maintenance [...] an estimate intended to cover individual variations of minimal nutritional need among apparently normal people." This technique has been the standard for developing dietary plans by international organizations like the FAO and the WHO.

References

Alfred E. Harper. Contributions of Women Scientists in the U.S. to the Development of Recommended Dietary Allowances. The American Society for Nutritional Sciences J. Nutr. 133:3698-3702, November 2003.
Yost, Edna. (1943) American Women of Science. Frederick A. Stokes Company, Philadelphia and New York.

1989 deaths
1896 births
American women nutritionists
American nutritionists
United States Department of Agriculture people
Skidmore College alumni
People from Ohio
Recipients of the President's Award for Distinguished Federal Civilian Service